The canton of Gex is an administrative division in eastern France. At the French canton reorganisation which came into effect in March 2015, the canton was reduced from 11 to 7 communes: 
Cessy 
Divonne-les-Bains
Gex
Grilly
Sauverny
Versonnex
Vesancy

Demographics

See also
Cantons of the Ain department 
Communes of France

References

Cantons of Ain